Second Generation Wayans is an American comedy-drama television series that debuted on BET on January 15, 2013. It ended on March 19, 2013 after only one season.

Premise
Damien Dante Wayans and Craig Wayans, nephews of the famous Wayans brothers, decide to start their own production company after struggling to break through in show business, both in front of and behind the camera. Their partner in the endeavor is honorary Wayans family member, actor George O. Gore II, whom most notably starred in My Wife and Kids.

Cast

Main
 Damien Dante Wayans as himself
 Craig Wayans as himself
 George O. Gore II as himself
 Tatyana Ali as Maya

Recurring
 LeToya Luckett as Rochelle
 Rob Bouton as Tony DiNapoli
 DeRay Davis as himself
Celeste Sullivan as Tiffany
 David Gallagher as Jeremy Silverman
 Regina Hall as herself
 Henry Simmons as Regin's new beau; Baron 'The Truth' Fouse
 Jon Abrahams as Gavriel Rosembaum

Guest appearances
 Marlon Wayans as himself
 Affion Crockett as himself
 Page Kennedy as William Stokes
 Kevin Hart as himself
 Faune A. Chambers as Keisha; Barry Silverman's assistant
 Gabourey Sidibe as herself
 Keith Robinson as Brock Matthews

Episodes

References

External links

2010s American comedy-drama television series
2013 American television series debuts
2013 American television series endings
English-language television shows
BET original programming
Television shows set in Los Angeles